The Times and The Sunday Times Cheltenham Literature Festival, a large-scale international festival of literature held every year in October in the English spa town of Cheltenham, and part of Cheltenham Festivals: also responsible for the Jazz, Music, and Science Festivals that run every year.

Introduction and history
Formed in 1949, The Times and The Sunday Times Cheltenham Literature Festival is the longest-running festival of its kind in the world. The Festival was founded by the Spa Manager George Wilkinson, in conjunction with the Tewkesbury-based author John Moore, who served as its first director. Actor Ralph Richardson, who was born in Cheltenham, launched the festival, and poet Cecil Day-Lewis, who taught at Cheltenham College, read a selection of contemporary verse. The Festival currently has the national newspaper The Times and Sunday Times as its 'title' sponsor: therefore making the full name of the festival The Times and The Sunday Times Cheltenham Literature Festival. The Festival's Artistic Director is Sarah Smyth and its Festival Director is Jane Furze. The Festival prides itself in showcasing the biggest names from contemporary culture with award-winning authors, up-and-coming writing talent and controversial debate. The 2013 Literature Festival issued around 135,000 tickets. the Festival remains one of the most prestigious literary events in the world. The festival also sees the presentation each year of the Nick Clarke Award for best broadcast interview, as well welcoming literary prize winners to discuss their most recent work.

The festival interprets the term "literature" broadly, featuring writers in every genre, including a good number of journalists and politicians.

The 2014 festival took place from Friday till Sunday, October 3–12 and was led by Guest Directors Shami Chakrabarti, Omid Djalili, Amit Chaudhuri, Sophie Hannah and Michael Rosen. In its varied programme of over 500 events, the Festival touched upon subjects as diverse as history, politics, sport, food and fashion. The theme of the 2014 Festival was "Brave New Worlds", which asks big questions such as: Is democracy at risk? Is technology changing our brains? What future for words? What does the next century hold?

The 2015 festival had as its "Big Read", the book To Kill a Mockingbird by Harper Lee. The 2016 festival had as its "Big Read", The Color Purple by Alice Walker.

The 2017 festival had Hillary Clinton interviewed by Mariella Frostrup on her disdain for current US president Donald Trump, WikiLeaks and Brexit voters.

The 2018 festival was held 5–14 October 2018. Highlighted speakers include Michael Parkinson, Prue Leith, William Boyd, Kate Atkinson, John Torode, Pat Barker, and Mary Beard.

The 2019 festival included an appearance by David Cameron.

Previous guests
Described as a 'literary lovers dream', the Festival has hosted the talents of some of the world's leading novelists, poets, humorists, historians, philosophers, actors and politicians. Previous guests include:

DanTDM, Salman Rushdie, Zadie Smith, Ruth Rendell, Gordon Brown, Martin Amis, Judi Dench, Stephen Fry, Michael Palin, Ian Hislop, Stephen Hawking, Richard Hammond, Armando Iannucci, Rik Mayall, Rory Bremner, Jon Snow, Simon Schama, Michael Buerk, Bruce Parry, Sophie Dahl, Ian McEwan, Anne Enright, A. C. Grayling, Sebastian Faulks, Naomi Klein, Tony Benn, Terry Wogan, Nick Hornby, Bob Geldof, Jeremy Paxman, Rupert Everett, Frank McCourt, Brenda Blethyn, Doris Lessing, Patrick Stewart, Toni Morrison, Ian Rankin, Kate Adie,  Richard Attenborough, David Starkey, Antony Sher, Michael Parkinson, Terry Jones, Tony Robinson, Sandi Toksvig, Dawn French, Simon Armitage, Clive James, Ruth Rendell, Alexander McCall Smith, Bruce Parry, Ray Mears, Frank Skinner, Janet Street-Porter, Roger Moore, Tony Curtis, John Barrowman, Russell T Davies, Dave Gorman, Charley Boorman, Alexei Sayle, Melanie C, Mark Thomas, and Laura Ulewicz.

See also 
 Cheltenham Prize for Literature
 The Playhouse, Cheltenham

References

External links
 Cheltenham Festivals official website
 Guide to Cheltenham and its festivals

Festivals in Cheltenham
Literary festivals in England
Recurring events established in 1949